Snape may refer to:

Places
 Snape Island, Hudson Bay, Canada
 Snape, North Yorkshire, a village in England
 Snape, Suffolk, a marshland, a village and an arts center in England

People
 Andrew Snape (1675–1742), headmaster of Eton College
 Andrew Snape Douglas (1761–1797), Scottish sea captain in the Royal Navy
 Jack Snape, half of the electropop duo To My Boy
 Jeremy Snape (born 1973), English cricketer
 Martin Snape (1852–1930), English painter
 Maurice Snape (1923–1992), English cricketer
 Peter Snape (born 1942), British politician and Baron Snape
 Steve Snape (born 1963), English former rugby league footballer
 William Snape (born 1985), British actor who is known for playing in The Full Monty

Arts and entertainment
 Severus Snape, a character in the Harry Potter books
 Snape (band), an English blues-rock ensemble